The 1895 Invercargill mayoral election was held on 27 November 1895 as part of that year's local elections.

John Sinclair defeated former mayor John Walker Mitchell.

Results
The following table gives the election results:

References

1895 elections in New Zealand
Mayoral elections in Invercargill